Pavel Zdráhal (born July 20, 1971) is a Czech former professional ice hockey right winger. He is currently the general manager and assistant coach of AZ Havířov of the 1st Czech Republic Hockey League.

Zdráhal played in the Czech Extraliga for HC Vítkovice, ASD Dukla Jihlava, HC Slezan Opava, HC Havířov, HC Zlín, HC Litvínov, HC Oceláři Třinec, VHK Vsetín and HC Sparta Praha. He also played in the Ligue Magnus for Anglet Hormadi Élite and Ours de Villard-de-Lans and in the Polska Hokej Liga for JKH GKS Jastrzębie.

His son Patrik Zdráhal currently plays for HC Verva Litvínov.

Career statistics

References

External links

1971 births
Living people
Anglet Hormadi Élite players
PSG Berani Zlín players
Czech ice hockey right wingers
HC Dukla Jihlava players
HC Havířov players
JKH GKS Jastrzębie players
HC Litvínov players
BK Mladá Boleslav players
HC Oceláři Třinec players
HC Olomouc players
Ours de Villard-de-Lans players
IHC Písek players
HC RT Torax Poruba players
HC Slezan Opava players
HC Slovan Ústečtí Lvi players
HC Sparta Praha players
Sportspeople from Ostrava
Hokej Šumperk 2003 players
HC Tábor players
HC Vítkovice players
VHK Vsetín players
Czechoslovak ice hockey right wingers
Czech ice hockey coaches
Czech expatriate ice hockey people
Czech expatriate sportspeople in France
Czech expatriate sportspeople in Poland
Expatriate ice hockey players in France
Expatriate ice hockey players in Poland